Sabine Brunswicker is a Full Professor  for Digital Innovation at Purdue University, West Lafayette, United States, and the Founder and Director of Research Center for Open Digital Innovation (RCODI).  She is a computational social scientist with a particular focus on open digital innovation who engages with an interdisciplinary group of researchers to predict individual and collective outcomes in open digital innovation. She has written numerous research papers and books chapters on Open Innovation, and is an internationally recognized authority in the field. She chaired the World Economic Forum workshop for a session titled "Open innovation as a driver of business and economic transformation" in 2014. She is known for pioneering Purdue IronHacks, an iterative hacking initiative (www.ironhacks.com) that encourages experiential learning at Purdue University.

Education and career  
Brunswicker holds a Bachelor of Science in Engineering and Management Sciences from Technische Universität Darmstadt, Darmstadt, Germany, a Master of Commerce from University of New South Wales, Australia, a Master of Science in Engineering and Management Sciences from University of Technology, Darmstadt, Germany, and a Phd in Engineering Sciences with highest honor from University of Stuttgart, Germany. She won an award from the publisher John Wiley & Sons and the International Society for Professional Innovation Management, ISPIM, for the doctoral dissertation from an engineer named the Best Dissertation Award in 2012.

She is currently a full professor and director of Research Center for Open Digital Innovation (RCODI) at Purdue University. She is also an Adjunct Professor of Digital Innovation in the School of Information Systems at Queensland University of Technology, Brisbane Australia. Until 2016, she was Visiting Professor for Digital Innovation at ESADE Business School. Prior to joining Purdue she was Head of Open Innovation at the Fraunhofer Institute for Industrial Engineering in Stuttgart, Germany.

She has won numerous awards throughout her professional careers, including runner-up emerging scholar award World Open Innovation Conference, ESADE Business School, Spain, John P. Lisack Early-Career Engagement Award from Purdue Polytechnic Institute, top researcher 2012 from Fraunhofer Society due to her accomplishments in the area of open innovation.

Selected publications (book chapters)
 Kremser, W., Pentland, B., & Brunswicker, S. (2019). The Continuous Transformation of Interdependence in Networks of Routines. In Book Series: Research in Sociology of Organizations. Emerald Insight, invited publication.   
 Brunswicker, S., Majchrzak, A., Almirall, E., & Tee, R. (2016). Co-creating value from open data: from incentivizing developers to inducing co-creation in open data ecosystems. In S. Nambisan (Ed.): Open Innovation and Innovation Networks (Vol. 1). World Scientific Publishing.   
 Brunswicker, S. (2016). Managing open innovation in small and medium-sized firms in the tourism sector. In W. Egger, I. Gula, & D. Walcher (Eds.), Open tourism: Open innovation, crowdsourcing, and collaborative consumption challenging the tourism industry. Berlin: Springer.   
 Bagherzadeh, M., & Brunswicker, S. (2016). Governance of Knowledge Flows in Open Exploration: The Role of Behavioral Control. In Das, T.K. (Ed.), Decision Making in Behavioral Strategy (DMBS), Information Age Publishing (IAP).   
 Brunswicker, S., & Johnson, J. (2015). From governmental open data toward governmental open innovation (GOI). In D. Archibugi & A. Filippetti (Eds.), The handbook of global science, technology, and innovation (1 ed., pp. 504–524): New Jersey: John Wiley & Sons, Ltd. 2   
 Brunswicker, S., & van de Vrande, V. (2014). Exploring open innovation in small and medium-sized enterprises. In H. Chesbrough, W. Vanhaverbeke, & J. West (Eds.), New frontiers in open innovation (1 ed., pp. 135–156). Oxford, United Kingdom: Oxford University Press.

Selected publications (referred journals)
 Brunswicker, S., & Chesbrough, H. (2018). The Adoption of Open Innovation in Large Firms: Practices, Measures, and Risks. Research Technology Management.   
 Brunswicker, S., Bilgram, V., & Fueller, J. (2017). Taming wicked civic challenges with an innovative crowd. Business Horizons, 60(2), Bogers, M., Zobel, A.-K., Afuah, A., Almirall, E., Brunswicker, S., Dahlander, L., ... Magnussen, M. (2017). The Open Innovation Landscape: Established Perspectives and Emerging Themes Across Different Levels of Analysis. Industry & Innovation, 24(1), 8–40.   
 Brunswicker, S., Matei, S. A., Zentner, M., Zentner, L., & Klimeck, G. (2017). Creating impact in the digital space: digital practice dependency in communities of digital scientific innovations. Scientometrics, 110(1), 417–426.   
 Brunswicker, S., & Vanhaverbeke, W. (2015). Open innovation in small and medium-sized enterprises (SMEs): External knowledge sourcing strategies and internal organizational facilitators. Journal of Small Business Management, 53(4), 1241-1263.   
 Brunswicker, S., Bertino, E., & Matei, S. (2015). Big data for open digital innovation – A research roadmap. Big Data Research, 2(2), 53-58. Chesbrough, H., & Brunswicker, S. (2014). A Fad or a Phenomenon? The Adoption of Open Innovation Practices in Large Firms. Research Technology Management, 57(2), 16–25.   
 Koch, G., Füller, J., & Brunswicker, S. (2011). Online crowdsourcing in the public sector: How to design open government platforms. Online Communities and Social Computing, 6778, 203-212. doi:10.1007/978-3-642-21796-8_22   
 Brunswicker, S., & Hutschek, U. (2010). Crossing horizons: Leveraging cross-industry innovation search in the front-end of the innovation process. International Journal of Innovation Management, 14(04), 683-702.

Research grants 
 08/2016 to 07/2017 Balancing the Grid through Energy Monitoring Systems: Information Visualization for Collective Awareness; Deans Graduate Assistant Award for Outstanding Research Proposals; $20,000; Principal Investigator 
 08/2016 to 10/2016 Biomedical Big Data Hacking for Civic Health Awareness; NIH grant; $2000; Co-Principal Investigator (with Bethany McGowan as Principal Investigator) 07/2015-06/2017 Creating Impact from Governmental Open Data (OD): Innovation Process Transparency in OD Contest Design; NSF grant; Science of Science and Innovation Policy (SciPI); 24 months grant; $238,641,29; Principal Investigator (with Ann Majchrzak, USC as Co-Principal Investigator) 
 06/2015 – 05/2017 Red Hat® Doctoral Researcher on Open Innovation Communities; Donation received from Red Hat Inc., Raleigh, North Carolina $100,000; Principal Investigator 
 04/2015 to 12/2016 Managing Open Innovation in Large Firms: Case Study Analysis; Sponsored Research Project; Sponsor: Accenture High Performance Institute\f; Chicago; $63,531,32 Principal Investigator 01/2015-08/2015 Conceptualization of the Social and Innovation Opportunities of Data Analysis; NSF grant; CIF21 DIBBS; 7months grant; $99,718; Co-Principal Investigator (with Mike Zentner; Principal Investigator; Purdue University) 
 07/2014 – 11/215 Global Open Innovation Executive Survey 2015; Sponsored Research Grant; Sponsor: University of Berkeley, Garwood Center for Corporate Innovation; $25,000; Principal Investigator 
 03/2015 – Present Open Innovation Community Research; Donation received from Landcare Research, Gerald Street, Lincoln, New Zealand 7608; $10,000 Principal Investigator (with Jeremiah Johnson and Ann Majchrzak) 
 2014 Research on CyberInfrastructures and Behavioral analytics, Purdue Internal Funding through nanoHUB.org NCN supported RCODI discovery efforts of a doctoral student with $18,201. Principal Investigator 
 2014-2015 Exploratory research in the social sciences; $50,000. Executive office of the Vice President (EVPR) Co-Principal Investigator (with Sorin Matei, Curriculum Vitae – April 2016 16 Communications and Gerhard Klimeck, ECE) $22,496. 
 2014 Open Strategies; Internal Funding from PCRD (Purdue Center for Regional Development); $10,066; Principal Investigator

References 

Living people
German social scientists
University of New South Wales alumni
University of Stuttgart alumni
Purdue University faculty
Academic staff of Queensland University of Technology
Year of birth missing (living people)
Technische Universität Darmstadt alumni
Information systems researchers